Zaratamo is a town and municipality located in the province of Biscay, in the autonomous community of Basque Country, northern Spain. Zaratamo has an area 10.2 km2 and an elevation of 173m. As of 2019 its population is 1,614 with a density of 158.8 people per km2. 50.1% of the population is female while 49.9% is male.

References

External links
 ZARATAMO in the Bernardo Estornés Lasa - Auñamendi Encyclopedia (Euskomedia Fundazioa) 

Municipalities in Biscay